Tsentralnoye is a rural locality (a selo) and the administrative center of Tsentralnoye Rural Settlement, Rakityansky District, Belgorod Oblast, Russia. The population was 678 as of 2010. There are 9 streets.

Geography 
Tsentralnoye is located 7 km northeast of Rakitnoye (the district's administrative centre) by road. Novozinaidinskoye is the nearest rural locality.

References 

Rural localities in Rakityansky District